Celebrity Big Brother 20 was the twentieth series of the British reality television series Celebrity Big Brother, hosted by Emma Willis and narrated by Marcus Bentley. The series launched on 1 August 2017, and  concluded on 25 August 2017 after 25 days, making this the shortest series since Celebrity Big Brother 12 in 2013. The series was on Channel 5 in the United Kingdom and 3e in Ireland with the spin-off show Celebrity Big Brother's Bit on the Side presented by Rylan Clark-Neal. It was the thirteenth celebrity series and twentieth series of Big Brother overall to air on Channel 5.

During the launch show on 1 August 2017, Willis confirmed that the winner would receive £50,000 for a charity of their choice. This is the first celebrity series to include a prize fund since Celebrity Big Brother 3 in 2005.

On 25 August 2017, Sarah Harding was announced as the winner of the series having received 35.33% of the final vote, with Amelia Lily as the runner-up after receiving 29.92%.

Production

Eye logo
The eye was released on 19 July 2017 and features a metallic golden eye.

Teasers
On 24 July 2017, a three-second teaser was released promoting the series. It includes a swimming pool with a "#CBB" inflatable in the water. The full length trailer was released on 26 July 2017. During the live final of Big Brother 18, a further trailer was released showing glimpses of the celebrities.

House
On 1 August 2017, the day of the launch, the official house pictures were released. The house clearly resembles from the one previously used from the last civilian season with boxed interior designs with flat toned colors that spans even with the redecorated garden.  The new house includes two bedrooms, "Forest Suite" and "Blossom Suite".

Housemates
On Day 1, fifteen celebrity housemates entered the house.

Amelia Lily
Amelia Lily is a British singer, known for being a contestant on the eighth series of The X Factor; where she reached the final and finished in third place. Since leaving The X Factor, Amelia released three Top 40 songs in the UK Singles Chart, including "You Bring Me Joy" which peaked at number 2. Lily was also the support act for fellow housemate, Sarah Harding, on her arena tour as a member of Girls Aloud. As an actress, she has appeared in stage shows such as American Idiot on the West End and Joseph and the Amazing Technicolor Dreamcoat on UK tour. She entered the house on Day 1 and left on Day 25 as the runner up.

Brandi Glanville
Brandi Glanville is an American television personality, known for being a cast member on the Bravo reality series The Real Housewives of Beverly Hills from 2011 until 2015. Since then she has appeared in the seventh series of The Celebrity Apprentice in 2015 where she placed fourth, as well as taking part in Famously Single in 2016. She is the ex-wife of actor Eddie Cibrian. She entered the house on Day 1 and became the fifth housemate to leave on Day 18. She later appeared in the first series of Celebrity Big Brother in the United States.

Chad Johnson
Chad Johnson is an American television personality, known for his appearances on the ABC reality dating game shows The Bachelorette during the twelfth season, where he tried to win the heart of JoJo Fletcher, and Bachelor in Paradise for the third season. In 2017, he took part in another dating show Famously Single. He entered the house on Day 1. He eventually came fifth place on Day 25.

Derek Acorah
Derek Johnson, known better as Derek Acorah, was a British spiritual medium known for appearing on the Sky Living paranormal reality television series Most Haunted from the first series in 2001 until the sixth series in 2006. He entered the house on Day 1. He left in fourth place on Day 25. He died on 4 January 2020 following a short illness.

Helen Lederer
Helen Lederer is a British comedian, actress and writer, known for playing Catriona in the BBC sitcom Absolutely Fabulous from 1992 onwards. She is a published author, and has also made appearances in the Channel 4 soap opera Hollyoaks in 2013 and 2015 as Mariam Andrews. She entered the house on Day 1. She became the eighth housemate to be evicted on Day 22.

Jemma Lucy
Jemma Henley, known better as Jemma Lucy, is a British reality television personality and glamour model, best known as a cast member in the MTV reality series, Ex on the Beach during the third series in 2015 before later returning for the fifth "All star" series in 2016. In 2011, Jemma was a contestant in Signed by Katie Price along with Big Brother's Bit on the Side host Rylan Clark-Neal. She is also the ex-girlfriend of Celebrity Big Brother 18 winner Stephen Bear. She entered the house on Day 1. During the final on Day 25, she finished in sixth place.

Jordan Davies
Jordan Davies is a British reality television personality, best known as a cast member in the ITV2 reality series Ibiza Weekender from the first series onwards, and the MTV reality series, Ex on the Beach during the third series in 2015 before later returning for the fourth and fifth "All star" series in 2016. He is the ex-fiancé of Celebrity Big Brother 17 housemate Megan McKenna. He entered the house on Day 1 and became the fourth housemate to be evicted on Day 15.

Karthik Nagesan
Karthik Nagesan is an Indian-born British businessman and television personality, known for competing on the twelfth series of The Apprentice in 2016. He entered the house on Day 1. Karthik became the second housemate to be evicted on Day 11.

Marissa Jade
Marissa Jade is an American television personality, known for being a cast member in the VH1 reality series Mob Wives during the show's sixth and final season in 2016. She entered the house on Day 1. On Day 8, she became the first housemate to be evicted after receiving the fewest votes to save.

Paul Danan
Paul Danan is a British actor known for playing Sol Patrick in the Channel 4 soap opera Hollyoaks from 1997 until 2001. In 2005 he took part in the first series of Celebrity Love Island before later returning for the second series in 2006. He entered the house on Day 1 and became the sixth housemate to be evicted on Day 18.

Sam Thompson
Sam Thompson is a British reality television personality, known for starring as a cast member on the E4 reality series, Made in Chelsea alongside his sister, Louise. He joined the show for the sixth series in 2013 and has remained as a cast member since. He entered the house on Day 1 and left in third place on Day 25.

Sandi Bogle
Sandy Channer, known better as Sandi Bogle, is a British television personality, known for starring in the observational documentary series, Gogglebox on Channel 4. Sandi appeared in the show from the first series in 2013 with her best friend Sandra, but left the show following its eighth series three years later. In 2016, she released her debut single "Casanova". She is the cousin of Naomi Campbell. She entered the house on Day 1. She became the seventh housemate to be evicted on Day 22.

Sarah Harding
Sarah Harding was a British singer and actress, known for being a member of the girl group Girls Aloud, which she won a place in following her appearance on the ITV television talent show Popstars: The Rivals in 2002. During her time in the group, they picked up one BRIT award and had four number one singles. However the group split in 2013, and Sarah launched a solo career. As an actress she played Joni Preston in the ITV soap opera Coronation Street in 2015. In 2016 she took part in the third series of The Jump. She entered the house on Day 1. On Day 25, it was announced that Sarah had won the series. She died on 5 September 2021 from breast cancer.

Shaun Williamson
Shaun Williamson is a British actor and singer, known for playing Barry Evans in the BBC soap opera EastEnders between 1994 and 2004. He entered the house on Day 1. He was evicted on Day 23, via the backdoor having received the fewest votes to win.

Trisha Paytas
Trisha Paytas is an American internet personality, model, actor and singer, known for their YouTube channel "blndsundoll4mj", which currently has over five million subscribers and a billion views. Their internet fame has led them to have appearances on television shows, including Modern Family and Dr. Phil. They have also appeared in Eminem's "We Made You" music video and the video for Amy Winehouse's "Tears Dry on Their Own" as well as having a music career of their own. They entered the house on Day 1. On Day 11, Trisha walked from the house.

Weekly summary

Nominations table

Notes

Ratings
Official ratings are taken from BARB. Ratings for the episodes on 12 and 19 August (Saturday on Week 3 and 4) include the first-look episode, which aired earlier in the evening on 5Star.

References

External links
 Official website 
 

2017 British television seasons
20